The IBM ThinkPad Power Series (and subsequent IBM RS/6000 Model 860 Notebook) (800/820/821/822/823/850/851/860) is a laptop series from the ThinkPad line that was manufactured by IBM. It is based on the PowerPC architecture.

History 
The first PowerPC notebook released by IBM was the RS/6000 Model N40, which was developed together with Tadpole Computer. It was announced in March 1994. The start of the sale was announced in October 1994.

Specifications 
Most of the 800 Series laptops used the PowerPC 603e CPU, at speeds of 100 MHz, or 166 MHz in the 860 model, although the earliest 800 (Type 6020), the direct ancestor of the 850, used a 603 and was apparently only offered to developers. All units used SCSI-2 instead of IDE hard disks, and the ID of every SCSI device on the system could be configured in the cursor driven GUI-based BIOS. Another unusual aspect of the series is their unique startup chime, reminiscent of Apple Macintosh computers of the time.

The PowerPC ThinkPad line was considerably more expensive than the standard x86 ThinkPads — even a modestly configured 850 cost upwards of $12,000. On the other hand, the 800, 850 and 851 (and later the 860 and 861) were capable of supporting an optional web camera, one of the first commercially available webcams available on a laptop. These units could also record PAL and NTSC signals with onboard composite connectors, and the batteries contained internal processors to regulate power usage for optimized battery longevity.

Software 
All of the PowerPC ThinkPads could run Windows NT 3.51 and 4.0, AIX 4.1.x, and Solaris Desktop 2.5.1 PowerPC Edition. Many of these PowerPC operating systems and the corresponding compilers are very scarce and hard to find. However, it is also possible to run certain PowerPC versions of Linux on the 800 Series.

Models

RS/6000 N40 
The ThinkPad line have a predecessor model (released in 1994 RS/6000 N40 with 50 MHz PowerPC 601 CPU and with design based on a Tadpole platform).

ThinkPad Power Series

ThinkPad 800 
The ThinkPad Power Series 800 (6020) has a new case design, similar to contemporary 700 series models, but with additional rounded palmrest.

ThinkPad 820 
The ThinkPad Power Series 820 has another case design (square case with small palmrest with two speakers).

This model has reported to run SuSE Linux and Windows NT 4.0 and that they are incompatible with Yaboot. The availability started at April 15, 1996.

ThinkPad 821/822/823 
This model was just an upgrade of the 820 model.

ThinkPad 850 
The ThinkPad Power Series 850 (6042-G6D) has a similar case to an 800 model.

This model has a motion video capture card and optional snap-in video camera.

ThinkPad 851 
This model was just an upgrade of the 850 model.

RS/6000 Notebook 860 
The IBM RS/6000 Notebook 860, sometimes incorrectly to referred as ThinkPad 860 can be seen as the successor of the ThinkPad 850.

Power Series 600 
The Power Series 600 was a prototype of a compact desktop system; this model was never released, and only prototypes can be found.

Canon Power Notebook 
Released by Canon Computer Systems in 1995, the Canon Power Notebook featured a 603e clocked at 100 MHz with 256 KB of external cache; 32 to 48 MB of RAM; an 810 MB hard drive; a double-speed CD-ROM drive; and a 10.4" active matrix color LCD. Though not marketed by IBM, Canon licensed the use of several components from the ThinkPad 755CD including the plastic case, and externally the Power Notebook was virtually identical to the 755CD save for Canon's logos.

References

External links 
 IBM ThinkPad Power Series 850
 IBM ThinkPad Power Series 850 - oldcomputer.info
 https://www.notebookcheck.net/A-look-back-at-25-years-of-ThinkPad-notebooks-Part-1-the-beginnings-with-IBM.251062.0.html
 http://www.ibmfiles.com/pages/tp820.htm
 http://home.icequake.net/~nemesis/linuxlaptops/ibm/thinkpad_misc/groups.csail.mit.edu/mac/ftpdir/thinkpad/old-archive/HTML/tp-1995/msg01259.html
 https://books.google.nl/books?id=SzoEAAAAMBAJ
 https://virtuallyfun.com/wordpress/2013/09/19/thinkpad-860-saga-part-1/
 https://www-01.ibm.com/common/ssi/ShowDoc.wss?docURL=/common/ssi/rep_sm/0/877/ENUS7249-860/index.html&lang=en&request_locale=en
 http://www.mars.dti.ne.jp/~ayase/tp/tp850.htm

IBM laptops
ThinkPad
PowerPC computers
Computer-related introductions in 1994